John Neff is an American musician based out of Athens, Georgia. He is most known for playing guitar and pedal steel guitar.

Background
Neff is originally from Columbus, Ohio and moved to Savannah, Georgia when he was 11. He moved to Athens, Georgia in his early twenties, at which time he started playing pedal steel guitar, for which he is better known. He received his first guitar at age 9 and began learning how to play, and began his music career when he arrived in Athens, Georgia. Some of his influences include BJ Cole, Buddy Emmons, David Lindley, and Lloyd Green.

Musical history
Some of Neff's earlier bands include the Chasers, Lona, Redneck Greece Deluxe, Star Room Boys, Barbara Cue, and Japancakes, operating out of Athens, Georgia. Japancakes is still active, releasing their most recent album Japancakes in May 2016.

Over the course of his musical career, he has performed and recorded with bands including The Allman Brothers Band, Bloodkin, Phosphorescent, Jerry Joseph, Superchunk, and Widespread Panic. He has also been involved with David Barbe and the Quick Hooks, Jack Logan and the Monday Night Recorders, and The Dexateens. He has appeared on The Tonight Show Starring Jimmy Fallon twice, Late Night with Conan O'Brien, Later... with Jools Holland, the Late Show With David Letterman and Conan. He also recorded on Bettye LaVette's Grammy nominated album The Scene of the Crime. Neff was also a founding member of Eye Candy with Shonna Tucker, which released an album in 2013. Some other bands he has recorded with are Bo Bedingfield and The Wydelles, Superhorse, The Judge and The Jury, Producto, Papercranes, Jason Isbell, Vic Chesnutt, and Call and Response.  Other associated acts include The Weight, The Eskimos, The Burning Angels, Norma Rae, and Future Lives.

Neff was a founding member of the noted band Drive-By Truckers and appears on their first two albums, Gangstabilly and Pizza Deliverance. He rejoined the band in 2006 and was a member until 2012. In his time with the band, he was in the albums Decoration Day, Brighter Than Creation's Dark, The Big To-Do, Go-Go Boots, and The Fine Print: A Collection of Oddities and Rarities. The band was also featured on Booker T. Jones' album Potato Hole, which won a Grammy Award for Best Contemporary Instrumental Album at the 52nd Grammy Awards in 2009.

Neff is currently involved in a Concerto for Rock Band with Strings with noted R.E.M. bass player Mike Mills featuring violinist Robert McDuffie that will perform in places such as Toronto and Rome with an upcoming tour of the states. The Concerto expanded to include Chuck Leavell playing a set of covers called "A Night of Georgia Music" The tour resumed in 2022.

Neff is also currently playing with Athens, GA country-rock band The Pink Stones. He recorded pedal steel on their most recent release, "Jimmy & Jesus", and is also featured on every song of their upcoming LP, recorded at Chase Park Transduction with Henry Barbe. He is also a member of the band's live lineup.

References

Musicians from Columbus, Ohio
Living people
Drive-By Truckers members
Year of birth missing (living people)